Klevis Dalipi (born 13 March 1976) is a retired Albanian football striker and football coach.

He previously played in Albania for Elbasani, Vllaznia and Shkumbini. He also played for Santa Clara and Ovarense in the Portuguese Second Division.

References

External links
 

1976 births
Living people
Footballers from Elbasan
Albanian footballers
Association football forwards
Albania international footballers
KF Elbasani players
C.D. Santa Clara players
C.D. Feirense players
A.D. Ovarense players
GD Bragança players
KF Vllaznia Shkodër players
KS Shkumbini Peqin players
KF Bylis Ballsh players
FC Kamza players
Albanian expatriate footballers
Expatriate footballers in Portugal
Albanian expatriate sportspeople in Portugal
Albanian football managers
FK Partizani Tirana managers